This page provides a partial list of television shows set in New York City.

Shows set primarily in the five boroughs

1940s–1960s

1970s

1980s

1990s

2000s

2010s

2020s

Shows set primarily in other parts of the New York metropolitan area
The Goldbergs (see above: moved to Haverville, New York, in final season)
I Love Lucy (see above: moved to Westport, Connecticut, in 1957 season)
The Dick Van Dyke Show (1961–1966, New Rochelle in Westchester County, with workplace scenes in Manhattan)
The Facts of Life 1979–1988, Peekskill, New York
Bewitched (1964–1972, Westport, Connecticut, with workplace scenes in Manhattan)
The Don Rickles Show (1972, Long Island)
Maude (1972–1978, Tuckahoe in Westchester County)
Who's the Boss? (1984–1992, Connecticut)
Growing Pains (1985–1992, Huntington in Long Island)
Dear John (1988–1992, New Rochelle in Westchester County)
Everybody Loves Raymond (1996–2005, Lynbrook on Long Island)
The Sopranos (1999–2007, North Caldwell, New Jersey, with occasional scenes in Manhattan)
Gilmore Girls (2000–2007); in Western Connecticut, some episodes in New York City
That's Life (2000–2002, fictional Bellefield, New Jersey, ostensibly Belleville or Bloomfield)
My Wife and Kids (2001–2005, Stamford, Connecticut)
Megas XLR (2004–2005, New Jersey)
House (2004–2012, fictional "Princeton-Plainsboro Teaching Hospital" in New Jersey; Princeton and Plainsboro are two adjacent towns within the New York metropolitan area.)
Animal House (television series) (2005–2006 in Port Washington, part of Long Island)
The Book of Daniel (2006), fictional Newbury in Westchester

See: The Five Boroughs, New York metropolitan area, Tri-State Region

Miniseries, specials or individual episodes
 Xiaolin Showdown
"My Homey Omi"
 Ben 10
"Kevin 11"
 Doctor Who
"Daleks in Manhattan / Evolution of the Daleks"
"The Angels Take Manhattan"
"The Return of Doctor Mysterio"
 Gamer's Guide to Pretty Much Everything
"The Big City"
 iCarly
"iShock America"
 Modern Family
"A Tale of Three Cities"
 Pretty Little Liars
'A' Is for Answers"
"Escape from New York"
 Totally Spies!
"Green with N.V."
"Dog Show Showdown"
"Zooney World"
 James Bond Jr.
"The Eiffel Missile"
"A Deranged Mind"
Suits
"Pilot"
The Office (U.S. TV series)
"Valentine's Day (The Office)"
"Night Out (The Office)"
"The Deposition (The Office)"
"Crime Aid"
Leah Remini: It's All Relative
New York City Part 1
New York City Part 2
Transformers: The Headmasters
"Terror! The Six Shadows"
Postcards from Buster
"Postcards from Buster" (Arthur Episode)
"A City View"
"A Bridge Back Home"
SpongeBob SquarePants
"Goons on the Moon"
Transformers: Super-God Masterforce
"BlackZarak – Destroyer from Space"
The Simpsons 
The City of New York vs. Homer Simpson
Danger Rangers
"Wild Wheels"
"Fires and Liars"
Entourage
"Return to Queens Blvd."
The Orville
"Old Wounds" aka Pilot (Set 400 years into future)
We Bare Bears
"Baby Orphan Ninja Bears"
Courage the Cowardly Dog
"Courage in the Big Stinkin' City"
"Mega Muriel the Magnificent"
"The Grand Tour"
 "The Falls Guys"
Scooby-Doo and Guess Who?
"The New York Underground!"
''Doki
"The Sky's the Limit"

See also
 List of television shows filmed in New York City
 List of movies set in New York City
 List of television shows set in Los Angeles
 List of television shows set in Washington, D.C.
 List of television shows set in Chicago
 List of television shows set in San Francisco
 List of television shows set in Miami

References

External links
Fun City: TV's Urban Situation Comedies of the 1990s

New York City
Television
Television